Pseudomantalania is a genus of flowering plants belonging to the family Rubiaceae.

Its native range is Madagascar.

Species:
 Pseudomantalania macrophylla J.-F.Leroy

References

Rubiaceae
Rubiaceae genera